Şuşma River may refer to several places:

 Sheshma, in Tatarstan and Samara Oblast, Russian Federation
 Shoshma, in Mari El, Tatarstan, and Kirov Oblast, Russian Federation